Česko Slovenská SuperStar (English: Czech&Slovak SuperStar) is the joint Czech-Slovak version of Idol series' Pop Idol merged from Česko hledá SuperStar and Slovensko hľadá SuperStar which previous to that had three individual seasons each.
The sixth season premiered in winter 2020 with castings held in Prague and Bratislava. It is broadcast on two channels: «TV Nova» (Czech Republic) and «Markíza» (Slovakia) which have also been the broadcast stations for the individual seasons.

Due to the COVID-19 pandemic audience were cut off from Semi-final and Final weeks were reduced from planned 5 to only 2 live shows.

Regional auditions
Auditions were held in Bratislava and Prague in the autumn of 2019.

Bunker - TOP 80
All 80 contestants who made it through auditions were allocated to Bunkr Drnov - Muzeum protivzdušné obrany (Drnov Bunker - Museum of Air Defense).

In the first round, the girls were called in groups of five to sing a cappella in front of the judges. Each girl had a few seconds to sing and after the entire group performed, they found out whether they were eliminated or they would continue in the next round.

The boys did not get to perform at all, the judges told them they all advanced to the next round, due to the smaller number of boys in the contest. Only five boys joined girls in this round.

The next round took place at the same night. All contestants have to perform songs of their choice in front of the judges. Not all contestants perform because some had impressed the judges before.

Divadlo (Theater) - TOP 48
48 contestants who made it through Bunker were allocated to Karlovy Vary Theater and they were divided into groups of 4. They have one day to learn song chosen by producers. All groups have session with vocal coach.

 Diana Kovaľová
| style="background:#B0E0E6;| Advanced
! style="background:cyan;"| 
| Matěj Vávra
| style="background:#B0E0E6;| Advanced
|-
! style="background:pink;"| 
| Tereza Navrátilová
| style="background:#FF91A4;| Eliminated
! style="background:pink;"|
| Sandrine Amadou Titi
| style="background:#FF91A4;| Eliminated
|-
| colspan=10 style="background:#555555;" |
|-
! style="background:cyan;"| 
| Václav Krušina
| rowspan="4" |"Demons"
| rowspan="4" |Imagine Dragons
| style="background:#FF91A4;| Eliminated
! style="background:cyan;"| 
| Luboš Mráz
| rowspan="4" |"Príbeh nekončí"
| rowspan="4" | Anthem of SuperStar
| style="background:#FF91A4;| Eliminated
|-
! style="background:pink;"| 
| Kamila Polonyová
| style="background:#FF91A4;| Eliminated
! style="background:pink;"| 
| Zara Prágerová
| style="background:#FF91A4;| Eliminated
|-
! style="background:cyan;"| 
| Timotej Májsky
| style="background:#B0E0E6;| Advanced
! style="background:pink;"| 
| Karin Křižová
| style="background:#B0E0E6;| Advanced
|-
! style="background:pink;"| 
| Natália Kollárová
| style="background:#B0E0E6;| Advanced
! style="background:cyan;"|
| Dávid Jakubkovič
| style="background:#FF91A4;| Eliminated
|}

26 contestants who made it through the first round were singing duets. Every duo will perform song chosen by production. This round is based on duels, which means from each duo the better singer will move on, but both singers could move on to the next round or both singers could be eliminated. Performances took place in Imperial Hotel in Karlovy Vary.

Semi-final
18 contestant made it to the semi-final. From the first time semi-final is not live event and it's prerecorded also for the first time judges pick whole TOP 10. Semi-final took place in Epic Club in Prague. Semifinal took place on March 18, 2020 and due to the COVID-19 pandemic audience were cut off from this round.

Top 18

Finalist

Finals
Final TOP 10 will perform in two live shows. Final shows will be filmed live in Studio Jinonice in Prague. Contestant and production members from Slovakia were tested for COVID-19 before they crossed borders of Czech Republic and after return they will take quarantine. Contesntat from Czech Republic were tested in Czech Republic and Diana Kovaľová who lives in Spain was tested in Spain. Also judge Pavol Habera was tested in USA where he was during last weeks.

Top 10

 Group performance: "Will You Be There" (Michael Jackson)

Top 5 - Grand Final
Unlike the First live show in this due lifting the quarantine in both Slovakia and Czech Republic family members will be in studio as audience. Judge Monika Bagárová will be judge via online broadcast from home in Grand final because she gave birth to a daughter 4 days before final. 

 Group performance: Medley of Czech and Slovak songs

Top 3 - Super Final

Elimination chart

Contestants who appeared on other seasons/shows
 Matěj Vávra was a finalist on X Factor season 1.
 Esther Lubadika was a semi-finalist on Česko Slovensko má talent season 3.
 Jan Fanta appeared on Česko Slovensko má talent season 7 but didn't make it through the audition.
 Daniel Mrózek was an artist on the first season of The Voice, joined Team Josef Vojtek and eliminated during fourth Live show.
 Jaroslav Dolník was a contestant from Česko Slovenská Superstar 2009 where he was eliminated during audition.
 Júlia Kramárová was a contestant from Deutschland sucht den Superstar season 17. She was eliminated in TOP 40.

References

External links 
Official Czech homepage hosted by Nova
Official Slovak homepage hosted by Markíza

Season 06
2010s Czech television series
2010s Slovak television series
2020 Czech television seasons